Ptychagnostus is a member of the agnostida that lived during the Cambrian period. Ptychagnostidae generally do not exceed one centimetre in length. Their remains are rarely found in empty tubes of the polychaete worm Selkirkia. The genus probably ranged throughout the water column. It has two glabellar lobes, and three pygidial lobes.

Type species
Agnostus punctuosus Angelin, 1851 from the Pt. punctuosus Zone of the Alum Shale (Drumian), Sweden (by original designation). Official ruling on the conservation of accepted usage of A. punctuosus as the type species was given by the International Commission on Zoological Nomenclature, 1993.

Remarks
Ptychagnostus affinis (Brøgger 1878)  was once considered a subspecies of Pt. punctuosus.
Laurie (2008)  grouped punctuosus and affinis within Ptychagnostus, but preferred to place the closely related atavus within Acidusus.

Ptychagnostidae Genera

Høyberget & Bruton (2008)  concluded that the following genera belong in the Ptychagnostidae: Ptychagnostus, Goniagnostus, Tomagnostus, Lejopyge, Aotagnostus and Onymagnostus.

Species

Ptychagnostus punctuosus (Type species).
Ptychagnostus affinis (formerly Pt. punctuosus affinis)
Ptychagnostus aculeatus 
Ptychagnostus akanthodes
Ptychagnostus atavus 
Ptychagnostus cassis 
Ptychagnostus ciceroides
Ptychagnostus cuyanus 
Ptychagnostus germanus 
Ptychagnostus gibbus
Ptychagnostus hybridus
Ptychagnostus intermedius 
Ptychagnostus michaeli
Ptychagnostus praecurrens  
Ptychagnostus seminula

References

External links
 

Agnostida genera
Agnostoidea
Cambrian trilobites
Burgess Shale fossils
Wheeler Shale
Paleozoic life of New Brunswick
Paleozoic life of Newfoundland and Labrador
Drumian genera